"Ah-Leu-Cha" is a bebop composition written in 1948 by American jazz saxophonist Charlie Parker. It is a contrafact of "I Got Rhythm". "Ah-Leu-Cha" was originally recorded by Charlie Parker All-Stars on September 18, 1948, in New York City for Savoy Records.

The composition has been performed and recorded by numerous artists, including notable recordings by Dizzy Gillespie, Miles Davis, Thelonious Monk, Charles Mingus, Archie Shepp, Art Farmer and Django Bates (English pianist on "Beloved Bird - 2010).

References 

Jazz compositions
1948 songs
1940s jazz standards
Compositions by Charlie Parker